Earle Clements (1896–1985) was a U.S. Senator from Kentucky from 1950 to 1957. Senator Clements may also refer to:

Charles H. Clements (born 1943), West Virginia State Senate
Judson C. Clements (1846–1917), Georgia
Robert Clements (Nebraska politician) (born 1950),

See also
Senator Clemens (disambiguation)